The list of ship launches in 1762 includes a chronological list of some ships launched in 1762.


References

1762
Ship launches